Europaschule Otto-Hahn-Gymnasium is a Gymnasium (high school) in Gifhorn, Lower Saxony, Germany. It is the first Gymnasium in Gifhorn and was founded in 1950 as a private school named "Höhere Privatschule Gifhorn" (Higher Private School Gifhorn). Easter 1954, the school became a public school. In 1969 the school was renamed in its today's name, "Otto-Hahn-Gymnasium".  As of 2005 it had 1,456 students and about 115 teachers and student teachers.

See also 
 Humboldt-Gymnasium

External links 
 School website (in German)

Educational institutions established in 1950
Gymnasiums in Germany
Schools in Lower Saxony
Gifhorn
1950 establishments in West Germany